Glycerophthora is a genus of moths in the family Gelechiidae. It contains the species Glycerophthora clavicularis, which is found in Malaysia.

The larvae feed on Garcinia mangostana. Pupation takes place in a white silken cocoon.

References

Gelechiinae